The Belmont transmitting station is a broadcasting and telecommunications facility next to the B1225, one mile west of the village of Donington on Bain in the civil parish of South Willingham, near Market Rasen and Louth in Lincolnshire, England. It is owned and operated by Arqiva.

It has a guyed tubular steel mast, with a lattice upper section. The mast was shortened in April 2010 and is now  in height. After the top section was removed, the mast's reduced height relegated it to the second-highest in the UK after Skelton.

Despite the mast being shortened it can be seen in daylight on clear days from most areas close to and within the Lincolnshire Wolds. On clear nights its bright red aircraft warning lights can be very widely seen across much of Lincolnshire from as far north as the River Humber and Barton-Upon-Humber; from the west of the county it can be seen from Lincoln, Gainsborough and Grantham; from the south of the county it can be seen from Spalding and Bourne; and from the east it can be seen from Skegness, Mablethorpe and most areas along the Lincolnshire coast. The lights can also be seen from many parts of Nottinghamshire, coastal areas of North West Norfolk and a few parts of Derbyshire on very clear nights.

Construction

The foundations were laid on Tuesday 30 June 1964.

The mast was constructed in 1965 and it came into service on 20 December of that year. Its ropes weigh 85 tons, made by British Ropes, with steel from Steel, Peech and Tozer of Templeborough in South Yorkshire. The column weighs 210 tons and has 375 segments, with steel from United Steel Companies at Scunthorpe in northern Lincolnshire.

The imperial measurement was the accepted value quoted by publications including the 1993 edition of the Guinness Book of Records. The metric measurement quoted by the current owners is  shorter.

Coverage
From its location, high in the Lincolnshire Wolds, it broadcasts digital television and both analogue and digital radio to Lincolnshire, eastern Yorkshire, northern parts of Norfolk and some parts of Nottinghamshire. When it was first operated it transmitted (amongst others) ITV station Anglia Television. Following a re-organisation of ITV coverage in 1972, from 1974 it started transmitting neighbouring station Yorkshire Television instead, which it continues to do to this day. Due to most of the region being flat, Belmont has few relay stations although there is a main relay station at Oliver's Mount covering the Scarborough area.

Transmitter power
In the analogue era Belmont, at 500 kW E.R.P. for the four main analogue television channels, was one of the most powerful transmitters in the UK, though there were four UK transmitters which were more powerful; Sutton Coldfield, Crystal Palace and Sandy Heath were all at 1000 kW and Emley Moor was 870 kW. After digital switchover Belmont's digital transmitting power was 50 kW for SDN (previously Mux A), 100 kW for Arqiva A & B (Mux C, D) and 150 kW for BBC A, D3&4 and BBC B (Mux 1, 2, B).

700MHz clearance
On 4 March 2020, Belmont was due to complete its 700MHz clearance and will become an A group transmitter, excluding the temporary MUXES 7 and 8 (see graph). Since Belmont started out as an A group for (just) analogue it returns to that band after being a wideband for 21 years. Technically the advent of C5 analogue complicated the issue for a few months prior to (dual) running digital transmissions started in 1998.

Services listed by frequency

Analogue television

20 December 1965 – 19 November 1966
First transmissions from the site: ITV's 405-line television service was fed by off-air reception of Mendlesham at Great Massingham in Norfolk, with an onward microwave link to Belmont via an intermediate point at Winceby in Lincolnshire.

19 November 1966 – 24 May 1971
The BBC's services came online on both VHF and UHF. BBC1 was initially fed by means of an off-air rebroadcast of Holme Moss but this was plagued by co-channel interference from the continent. BBC2 was an off-air rebroadcast from Emley Moor. On 19 March 1969, the Emley Moor mast collapsed, taking Belmont's BBC2 transmissions off-air for several days.

Despite the programme sources on VHF and UHF being (for many years) off-air rebroadcasts of other transmitters in the vicinity, Belmont was always regarded by the BBC as being a "main station" both on VHF and UHF. The IBA initially regarded it as a relay of Mendlesham (and numbered it 14.2 in their numbering of VHF stations) but from 1974 it became a "main station" for Yorkshire Television (renumbered as 20.0 in the IBA's numbering of VHF stations) after changes in the minor franchise areas.

It was always number 120.0 in the BBC/IBA numbering scheme for UHF stations).

24 May 1971 – 30 July 1974
ITV's UHF service began.

30 July 1974 – 2 November 1982
After changes to the regional structure of ITV in 1972, Belmont stopped being a relay of Mendlesham and became a main station for Yorkshire TV.   It was fed by a Post Office (later BT) microwave link from Leeds, allowing Yorkshire TV to supply Belmont with a separate 7-minute segment of their regional news magazine programme "Calendar", a Belmont titled version of Anglia's weather forecast, as well as having the ability to sell advertising separately in the Belmont and Emley Moor areas.     The microwave link from Leeds to Belmont apparently ran via Emley Moor, where the IBA could insert test transmissions, such as Test Card "F"

2 November 1982 – 30 March 1997
Both the BBC and ITV 405-line VHF TV services from Belmont were discontinued early in mid-1982, and when Channel 4 began formal transmissions in November that year it was radiated on UHF from the site:

30 March 1997 – 15 November 1998
Belmont started transmitting the UK's final terrestrial analogue UHF TV service: Channel 5. This was done well out-of-band and at reduced power compared with the main group.

Analogue and digital television

15 November 1998 – 3 August 2011
Belmont began transmitting digital TV, with the new digital multiplexes spaced far from the existing analogue channels. In July 2007 it was confirmed by Ofcom that Belmont would be remaining a wideband transmitter after digital switchover.

3 August 2011 – 17 August 2011
BBC2 closed on UHF 28. BBC1 was moved on to that channel for its final three weeks of service. Pre-DSO Multiplex 1 (BBC) on UHF 30 was closed and was replaced by BBC A on UHF 22.

Digital television

17 August 2011 – 26 November 2013
All the remaining analogue and existing digital signals were turned off and replaced with higher-power digital signals.

Arqiva A and Arqiva B were limited to 4 kW until 23 November 2011, when they were increased to 100 kW.

26 November 2013 – 4 February 2020
Local TV, carrying Estuary TV, and Arqiva C, carrying additional HD services, launched on 26 November 2013.

5 February 2020 - 03 March 2020
Arqiva A moved from UHF 53 to UHF 23, in accordance with the 700MHz clearance.

4 March 2020 - 24 June 2020
Arqiva B moved from UHF 60- to UHF 26, and a power increase of the Local multiplex, in accordance with the 700MHz clearance.

25 June 2020 - Present
COM 8 was switched off permanently in accordance with the 700MHz clearance programme.

Analogue radio (FM VHF)

19 November 1966 – 11 November 1980

11 November 1980 – February 1992
BBC Radio Lincolnshire started broadcasting.

February 1992 – present day
Lincs FM and Classic FM join the set of FM broadcasts.

Digital radio (DAB)

Relays
Below is a list of transmitters that relay Belmont.

Digital television

See also
 List of tallest buildings and structures in the world
 List of tallest buildings and structures in Great Britain
 List of masts
 List of radio stations in the United Kingdom

References

External links

 The Transmission Gallery: Belmont index.
 Info and pictures of Belmont, including co-receivable channels.
 Belmont at UK Free TV.
 Pictures of Belmont at Geograph.
 Belmont Transmitter at thebigtower.com

Relay stations
 Grimsby
 Hunmanby
 Lincoln Central
 Oliver's Mount
 Weaverthorpe

Radio masts and towers in Europe
Buildings and structures in Lincolnshire
Transmitter sites in England
Infrastructure completed in 1965
1965 in British television
1965 establishments in England
East Lindsey District
Mass media in the East Midlands
West Lindsey District
Yorkshire Television